The North York Rockets were a professional soccer team based in North York, Toronto, Ontario that competed in the original Canadian Soccer League. They were one of four teams to participate in every season of the CSL. Upon the demise of the CSL, the Rockets joined the Canadian National Soccer League.

History

Canadian Soccer League
The North York Rockets were formed by a group consisting of Gus Mandarino, Basil Policaro, Tony Ciamarra, Joe D'Urzo, Mario Rollo, and Mario Giangioppo to play in the inaugural season of the Canadian Soccer League in 1987.

In their debut league match, the Rockets tied the Toronto Blizzard, by a score of 1-1.

The Rockets's best result came in 1991 when they defeated the Nova Scotia Clippers with a 9-1 goal aggregate to advance to the league cup semi-finals. The Rockets struggled in their first season, winning only one match, en route to a 1-7-12 record, finishing last in the league.

The Rockets improved in the following seasons, qualifying for the playoffs in each of the next three seasons, although they were defeated in the first round of the playoffs each year. During the 1991 season, the Rockets finished third in the league, qualifying for the playoffs for the fourth consecutive season. The won their first and only CSL playoff series when they defeated the Nova Scotia Clippers by an aggregate score of 9-1 (5-1 and 4-0 victories), but were defeated in the semi-finals by city rival Toronto Blizzard. During the 1992 season, the Rockets finished in second place in the regular season, six points behind league leaders Vancouver, but were once again defeated in the first round of the playoffs by eventual champions Winnipeg.

Canadian National Soccer League
Following the folding of the CSL after the 1992 season, the Rockets joined the semi-professional Canadian National Soccer League for the 1993 season, becoming known as the Toronto Rockets. They finished in first place in the Western Conference (and in he overall league table), qualifying for the playoffs where they defeated London City and Montreal Croatia in the first two rounds, but were defeated by St. Catharines Roma in the championship final.

American Professional Soccer League

After the 1993 season, the Toronto Blizzard, who had joined the US-based American Professional Soccer League in 1993, folded and were replaced by the Rockets, who inherited some of the Blizzard players and played under the name Toronto Rockets. The Rockets finished in last place with a 5-15 record, as well as the worst attendance in the league, drawing in fewer than 1500 fans per match. The club had planned to return for the 1995 season, but withdrew only days before the start of the 1995 season, due to a financial dispute with the league's front office.

Seasons
as North York Rockets

as Toronto Rockets

Notable players

References

Resource
North York Rockets Official Program

Canadian National Soccer League teams
Canadian Soccer League (1987–1992) teams
Defunct soccer clubs in Canada
Soccer clubs in Toronto
North York